Wollstonecraft is a harbourside suburb on the lower North Shore of Sydney, New South Wales, Australia, 4 kilometres north of the Sydney central business district, in the local government area of North Sydney Council.

History
Wollstonecraft left England to seek fortune for himself and his sister Elizabeth and to escape the notoriety of his aunt, Mary Wollstonecraft, author of the book A Vindication of the Rights of Woman.

Edward Wollstonecraft's business associate, Alexander Berry, was another prominent resident in the area, and namesake of Berry Island, a harbour-side location in Wollstonecraft.

The suburb is rich in its architectural history with a mixture of stately Victorian and Federation houses.

The area is part of the traditional lands of the Cammeraygal people of the Eora nation.

As of 2019 Wollstonecraft is ranked as the 6th most liveable suburb in Sydney out of the 569 on Domain.

Population
In the 2016 Census, there were 8,323 people in Wollstonecraft.  55.7% of people were born in Australia. The next most common countries of birth were England 6.3%, China 3.9%, New Zealand 2.7%, Hong Kong 2.0% and India 1.9%. 69.3% of people spoke only English at home. Other languages spoken at home included Mandarin 4.1%, Cantonese 3.9%, Spanish 1.7% and Japanese 1.5%. The most common responses for religion were No Religion 39.2%, Catholic 21.3%, and Anglican 11.3%.

Natural Reserves and Parks 

 Badangi Reserve – Badangi Reserve is a small protected reserve with one main path connecting adjacent Berry Island and Wondakiah up to Bridge End road near the trainline
 Berry Island – The most well known park in the suburb which has a large open grass strip next to the harbour and a loop bush track with a lookout overlooking the inner harbour as well as Indigenous rock engravings further along the trail.
 Gore Cove Reserve – Long waterside bush trail up Berry's creek from Berry Island up to Smoothey park and Wollstonecraft railway station.
 Brennan Park – Popular park next to Waverton and the train line with a large playground and open space.
 Smoothey Park
 Oyster Cove Reserve
 Harry Howard Reserve

Transport
Wollstonecraft railway station is on the North Shore & Western Line of the Sydney Trains network.

Notable residents
 John Howard, former Prime Minister of Australia.

References

External links

Wollstonecraft